Hoop is a surname. Notable people with the surname include:

Gregor Hoop (born 1964), Liechtenstein alpine skier
Imbi Hoop (born 1988), Estonian footballer
Jesca Hoop (born 1975), American singer-songwriter and guitarist
Josef Hoop (1895–1959), Liechtenstein politician
Martin Hoop (1892–1933), German politician
Ronald Hoop (born 1967), Dutch-Surinamese footballer
Wyn Hoop (born 1936), German singer

See also
Van der Hoop

Dutch-language surnames